The 2012 Kakkonen season began on 18 April and ended on 6 October 2012.

Teams
A total of 40 teams contested the league divided into four groups, Eteläinen (Southern), Pohjoinen (Northern), Läntinen (Western) and Itäinen (Eastern). 30 returned from the 2011 season, three relegated from Ykkönen and seven promoted from Kolmonen. The champion of each group qualified to promotion matches to decide which two teams get promoted to the Ykkönen. The bottom two teams in each group and the worst eight-placed qualified directly for relegation to Kolmonen. Each team played a total of 27 matches, playing three times against each team of its group.

Stadia and Locations

League tables

Eteläinen (Southern)

Pohjoinen (Northern)

Note: The match PS Kemi – TP-47 originally finished 1–0, but the result was changed to 0–3, as PS Kemi fielded an ineligible player.

Läntinen (Western)

2. The match TPV – JIlves originally finished 1–1, but the result was changed to 3–0, as JIlves fielded an ineligible player.
3. The match JIlves – Ilves originally finished 3–5, but the result was changed to 0–3, as JIlves fielded an ineligible player.

Itäinen (Eastern)

4. The match Gnistan – Atlantis FC originally finished 0–1, but the result was changed to 3–0, as Atlantis FC fielded an ineligible player.

Promotion play-offs
Group winners will play two-legged ties. Team pairs will be drawn and the two winning teams will be promoted to the Ykkönen for season 2013.

Group winners
Eteläinen (Southern): ÅIFK
Pohjoinen (Northern): AC Kajaani
Läntinen (Western): Ilves
Itäinen (Eastern): JäPS

First leg

Second leg

AC Kajaani won 1–0 on aggregate.

Ilves won 5–1 on aggregate.

Eight-placed teams
At the end of the season, a comparison is made between the eight-placed teams. The worst eight-placed team will be directly relegated to the Kolmonen.

See also
2012 Veikkausliiga
2012 Finnish League Cup
2012 Suomen Cup
2012 Ykkönen

References
Kakkonen 2012

Kakkonen seasons
3
Fin
Fin